In-sook, also spelled In-suk, is a Korean feminine given name. Its meaning differs based on the hanja used to write each syllable of the name. There are 29 hanja with the reading "in" and 13 hanja with the reading "sook" on the South Korean government's official list of hanja which may be used in given names. In-sook was the eighth-most popular name for newborn South Korean girls in 1950.

People with this name include:
Tak In-suk (born 1949), North Korean speed skater
Lee In-sook (born 1950), South Korean volleyball player 
Ahn In-sook (born 1952), South Korean actress
Insook Bhushan (Korean name Na Insook, born 1952), South Korean-born American table tennis player
Hwang In-suk (born 1958), South Korean poet
Insook Choi (born 1962), South Korean-born American composer
Kim Insuk (born 1963), South Korean writer
Kwon In-suk (born 1964), South Korean labour organiser
Guk In-suk (born 1965), South Korean rower

See also
List of Korean given names

References

Korean feminine given names